The Pesa Link is a family of diesel multiple unit trains built by Pesa.

First units entered service in 2012.

History

Czech Republic
The first contract for the delivery of Link units to the Czech Republic was signed in April 2011.

Poland
Koleje Dolnośląskie's Link units were built in 2014 and 2015.

In April 2017, the first Link unit for Polregio was delivered.

The four Koleje Wielkopolskie Link units were ordered in 2018.

Germany
The first Pesa Link in Germany entered service with Niederbarnimer Eisenbahn in 2016.

Link units operated by Deutsche Bahn are classified as 632 and 633.

Accidents and incidents
On 7 July 2020, ČD Class 844 unit 844 005 was involved in a head-on collision at Pernink. Two people were killed and 24 were injured.
On 4 August 2021, ČD Class 844 unit 844 006 was involved in a head-on collision at Milavče that killed three people.

References

External links

PESA SA
Diesel multiple units of the Czech Republic
Diesel multiple units of Poland
Diesel multiple units of Germany
